Adolphe Déchenaud (28 June 1868, Saint-Ambreuil – 27 December 1926, Neuilly-sur-Seine) was a French painter who specialized in Biblical/historical scenes and portraits.

Biography 
He was the son of a Parisian restaurateur, born while his mother was visiting her parents. She remained there for two years before bringing him back to Paris. At the age of fifteen, having noticed his artistic talent, his father enrolled him at the Académie Julian, where he studied with Jules Joseph Lefebvre, Gustave Boulanger and Jean-Joseph Benjamin-Constant.

In 1885, he competed for entry to the École des Beaux-arts, but was obliged to perform military service in 1886. After a year with the 13th Infantry Regiment in Nevers, he returned to the Académie.

He achieved second-place in the Prix de Rome competition in 1891 for his depiction of Philemon and Baucis. Three years later, he shared the Grand Prize with Auguste Leroux  for his version of Judith beheading Holofernes. That same year, he went to the Villa Médicis and remained there until 1898.

During this time, he painted the portraits of several of his fellow residents who would later become well-known, including André Devambez, François-Léon Sicard and Emmanuel Pontremoli. His first exhibition at the Salon was in 1899. He only received an honorable mention, but this was followed by medals in 1900 and 1901. At the Salon of 1913, he received the Medal of Honor. He also became a teacher at the  Académie.

In 1914, at the beginning of World War I, he produced one of his most familiar paintings; Le comité des forges (the Foundry Committee), a tableau of the twenty-five most powerful French industrialists. After the war, he was elected a to succeed Raphaël Collin in Seat#11 at the Académie des Beaux-Arts. Upon his death, he was succeeded by Lucien Simon. He is interred in a mausoleum in Nanton, which he had made his second home.

References

Further reading 
Georges Lecomte, "Adolphe Déchenaud ', in La Revue de l'art ancien et moderne, Vol.42, 12 June 1922 Online
Louis Collin, Notice sur la vie et les œuvres de M. Adolphe Déchenaud lue dans la séance du samedi 17 décembre 1927, Institut de France, 1927

External links

 Works by Déchenaud @ the Base Joconde

1868 births
1926 deaths
19th-century French painters
French male painters
20th-century French painters
20th-century French male artists
Portrait painters
Académie Julian alumni
Academic staff of the Académie Julian
École des Beaux-Arts alumni
Prix de Rome for painting
People from Saône-et-Loire
19th-century French male artists